

Smith Island is  long and  wide, lying  west of Deception Island in the South Shetland Islands of the British Antarctic Territory. Surface area .

The discovery of the South Shetland Islands was first reported in 1819 by Capt. William Smith, for whom the island is named. This island was known to both American and British sealers as early as 1820, and the name Smith has been well established in international usage for over 100 years, although in Russian literature it is often referred to as Borodino Island, sometimes marked as Borodino (Smith) Island.

The island hosts no research stations or camps, and is seldom visited by scientists or mountaineers. The first detailed topographic mapping of the island was made by the Antarctic Place-names Commission and the Military Geographic Service of the Bulgarian Army and published in 2009 in both English and Bulgarian.

See also
 Composite Antarctic Gazetteer
 Imeon Range
 List of Antarctic islands south of 60° S
 SCAR
 South Shetland Islands
 Territorial claims in Antarctica

References

External links 
 Smith Island. SCAR Composite Antarctic Gazetteer
 Smith Island. Interactive image

Maps
 Chart of South Shetland including Coronation Island, &c. from the exploration of the sloop Dove in the years 1821 and 1822 by George Powell Commander of the same. Scale ca. 1:200000. London: Laurie, 1822.
  L.L. Ivanov. Antarctica: Livingston Island and Greenwich, Robert, Snow and Smith Islands. Scale 1:120000 topographic map. Troyan: Manfred Wörner Foundation, 2010.  (First edition 2009. )
 South Shetland Islands: Smith and Low Islands. Scale 1:150000 topographic map No. 13677. British Antarctic Survey, 2009.
 Antarctic Digital Database (ADD). Scale 1:250000 topographic map of Antarctica. Scientific Committee on Antarctic Research (SCAR). Since 1993, regularly upgraded and updated.
 L.L. Ivanov. Antarctica: Livingston Island and Smith Island. Scale 1:100000 topographic map. Manfred Wörner Foundation, 2017.